Francis Leonard Sigafoos (March 21, 1904 – April 12, 1968) was a third baseman  who played for the Philadelphia Athletics, Detroit Tigers, Chicago White Sox and the Cincinnati Reds of Major League Baseball. Prior to his professional career, Sigafoos attended Purdue University, where he played college baseball for the Boilermakers from 1923–1926.

References

External links

1904 births
1968 deaths
Major League Baseball third basemen
Baseball players from Pennsylvania
Chicago White Sox players
Cincinnati Reds players
Decatur Commodores players
Detroit Tigers players
Indianapolis Indians players
Los Angeles Angels (minor league) players
Louisville Colonels (minor league) players
Memphis Chickasaws players
Monett Red Birds
Newark Bears (IL) players
Oklahoma City Indians players
Philadelphia Athletics players
Portland Beavers players
Providence Grays (minor league) players
Purdue Boilermakers baseball players